Miriam (minor planet designation: 102 Miriam) is a moderately large, very dark main belt asteroid. It was discovered by C. H. F. Peters on August 22, 1868, from the Litchfield Observatory.

Peters named the asteroid after Miriam, the sister of Moses in the Old Testament. This caused some controversy, because at the time, asteroids were expected to be named after mythological figures, and the devout would not regard Biblical figures as such. According to fellow astronomer Edward S. Holden, Peters deliberately chose a name from the Bible so as to annoy an overly pious theology professor of his acquaintance.

Initially classified as a D-type asteroid, it was later classed as C-type based upon a broad absorption feature below 4,000 Å, most likely due to phyllosilicates on the surface.

Photometric observations of this asteroid during 2007 at the Organ Mesa Observatory in Las Cruces, New Mexico, were used to create a light curve plot. This showed a rotation period of 23.613 ± 0.001 hours and a brightness variation of 0.12 ± 0.02 magnitude. The curve shows three maxima and minima during each cycle. This value for the period differs from the 15.789 hour estimate produced in a 2008 study.

References

External links 
 
 

000102
000102
000102
Discoveries by Christian Peters
Named minor planets
18680822